The Nuremberg International Human Rights Award is a biennial German award founded on September 17, 1995. The date chosen is significant; 60 years earlier, the Nuremberg Race Laws were adopted. Also, on September 17, 1939, Poland was invaded by the Soviet Union, soon after the German invasion that marked the beginning of World War II. Furthermore, the award was introduced 50 years after the end of the Second World War.

Origin and intentions 
The award is endowed with €25,000 and is presented every two years to individuals or groups who have, in an exemplary manner, committed themselves to human rights, sometimes at considerable personal risk. The amount mentioned was €15,000 in the first years but has meanwhile been raised to €25,000. The awarding ceremony usually takes place in the Nuremberg Opera House and is followed by the Nuremberg Peace Table, an outdoor citizens′ festival in honour of the prizewinners, in the Way of Human Rights.

Prizewinners 
As of 2023, the prize has been awarded to 6 women and 11 men from 17 different countries. In 1997 and 2003, two persons were decorated.

Jury 
An international jury, headed by the Lord Mayor of Nuremberg, chooses the winner of the Human Rights Award, every two years. The members of the jury are elected for a period of four years. The current members are

The high standing of this jury and the support lent by the United Nations, UNESCO and renowned non-government organisations have contributed to the award having won considerable international repute and its intention of protecting human rights defenders taking effect.

References

External links 
 Nuremberg International Human Rights Award, Official Website

Human rights awards
Peace awards
Nuremberg